Landsnet is a transmission system operator of the Icelandic high-voltage power grid. It is a public company owned by Landsvirkjun (64.73%), RARIK (22.51%), Orkuveita Reykjavíkur (6.78%), and Orkubu Vestfjarða (5.98%).

Landsnet was established in 2005 by separating from Landsvirkjun.  It is a member of the European Network of Transmission System Operators for Electricity.

References

External links

Electric power transmission system operators in Iceland